Warner Bros. Family Entertainment was the family division label of Warner Bros. Entertainment Inc. It released numerous theatrical and direct-to-video family-oriented films and television shows.

History 
The division was founded in 1992 to produce more family-friendly films. The first theatrical film released under the Family Entertainment label was Dennis the Menace, released in the summer of 1993. The film proved to be a huge hit at the box office, grossing over $50 million at the domestic box office despite receiving negative reviews from critics. Following it was Free Willy, which was also released in the summer of 1993 and would also be a huge box office hit, grossing over $75 million domestically.

Other 1993 releases included a live-action film adaptation of the book The Secret Garden, which didn't perform as well as the previous two films but still garnered over $30 million at the domestic box office, and George Balanchine's The Nutcracker. The last 1993 WBFE theatrical release was Batman: Mask of the Phantasm, and it wasn't a success at the box office, getting only $5 million at the box office compared to its $6 million budget, due to a lack of promotion from Warner Bros.

In 1994, it was the worst year for WBFE, where it was home to numerous box-office bombs. In the early part of 1994, Warner released Thumbelina, which was a major box-office bomb. Another 1994 film was a live-action rendition of the book Black Beauty, which was another box-office bomb for the studio, grabbing only nearly $5 million at the box office. Following it was A Troll in Central Park, which garnered less than $1 million at the box office. The last two films in 1994 were Little Giants, which performed better, but only received nearly $20 million domestically and Richie Rich, which was only a minor box-office bomb, grossing over $38 million for its $40 million budget.

In 1995, it brought a live-action rendition of the book A Little Princess, which only got over $10 million in its domestic release. Other films that year included international distribution of The Pebble and the Penguin, which was a box-office bomb, grossing nearly $4 million, and Born to Be Wild, which also garnered nearly $4 million. However, the biggest success of 1995 for the company was the sequel to Free Willy, Free Willy 2: The Adventure Home, which, although not nearly as successful as the first film, was a minor success, garnering over $30 million.

In 1996, it saw WBFE's biggest hit yet, Space Jam, which garnered over $90 million domestically. The following year, the division released Turner Feature Animation's Cats Don't Dance (inherited from Turner Pictures as a result of Time Warner's merger with Turner Broadcasting), which bombed at the box office with over $3 million earned stemming from a lack of promotion. The next 1997 film was a sequel to The Swan Princess, The Swan Princess: Escape from Castle Mountain, but it performed poorly at the box office mainly because of a limited theatrical release. The final 1997 film was the third Free Willy film, Free Willy 3: The Rescue, which performed poorly, grossing over $3 million.

In 1998, it released Warner Bros. Feature Animation's Quest for Camelot, which would be a box-office bomb, but grossed more than previous films released by the company, grossing nearly $23 million domestically. In 1999, WBFE released two more films, the poorly performed The King and I, which only grossed nearly $12 million, and Brad Bird's The Iron Giant, which was also a box-office bomb, grossing over $23 million. The Iron Giant would, however, go on to become a cult classic through video releases and TV airings. The only film released under WBFE in 2000 was My Dog Skip, which became the company's first major box-office success in nearly four years, grossing nearly $35 million. 

Two more family films were released in 2001 through WBFE. Cats & Dogs was proved to be one of the biggest successes of the company's history, grossing over $200 million worldwide. The next film, Osmosis Jones, was hoped to follow the previous two films in the success line-up, but flopped, only grossing nearly $15 million.

Warner Bros. continued to release family films later in the 2000s as well as the 2010s, but the logo for its Family Entertainment subsidiary was no longer used in the USA.

WBFE continued operations in Germany until 2009, after releasing Laura's Star and the Mysterious Dragon Nian.

Though made before Warner Bros. created the label, The label also covers the VHS releases of Calamity Jane, Willy Wonka and the Chocolate Factory, Bugs Bunny's 3rd Movie: 1001 Rabbit Tales, The NeverEnding Story, The Goonies, Daffy Duck's Quackbusters, All Dogs Go to Heaven (the 1996 UK VHS release only), The NeverEnding Story II: The Next Chapter, Rover Dangerfield, Curly Sue and Lois & Clark: The New Adventures of Superman.

Notable theatrical films 
 Dennis the Menace (1993, co-production with Hughes Entertainment)
 Free Willy (1993, co-production with Regency Enterprises)
 The Secret Garden (1993)
 George Balanchine's The Nutcracker (1993)
 Batman: Mask of the Phantasm (1993, co-production with DC Entertainment)
 Thumbelina (1994, produced by Don Bluth Entertainment)
 Black Beauty (1994)
 A Troll in Central Park (1994, produced by Don Bluth Entertainment)
 Little Giants (1994, co-production with Amblin Entertainment)
 The Pagemaster (1994, non-US distribution only)
 The NeverEnding Story III: Escape from Fantasia (1994, non-US distribution only)
 Richie Rich (1994, co-production with Silver Pictures, Davis Entertainment and The Harvey Entertainment Company)
 Born to Be Wild (1995)
 A Little Princess (1995)
 Free Willy 2: The Adventure Home (1995, co-production with Regency Enterprises)
 The Amazing Panda Adventure (1995)
 The Pebble and the Penguin (1995, non-US distribution only, produced by Don Bluth Entertainment)
 It Takes Two (1995, co-production with Rysher Entertainment)
 Gumby: The Movie (1995, German distribution only, produced by Premavision, Inc.)
 Space Jam (1996)
 Shiloh (1996)
 Cats Don't Dance (1997, co-production with Turner Entertainment Co.)
 A Rat's Tale (1997, co-production with Augsburger Puppenkiste and Monty Film) 
 The Fearless Four (1997, co-production with Munich Animation, Stardust Pictures London, and Bioskop Film)
 Air Bud (1997, UK distribution only)
 Wild America (1997, co-production with Morgan Creek Entertainment)
 The Swan Princess: Escape from Castle Mountain (co-distribution with Legacy Releasing)
 Free Willy 3: The Rescue (1997, co-production with Regency Enterprises)
 Quest for Camelot (1998)
 The King and I (1999, co-production with Morgan Creek Entertainment)
 The Iron Giant (1999)
 Tobias Totz and his Lion (1999) (co-production with Munich Animation, Stardust Pictures London, and Bioskop Film)
 My Dog Skip (2000, co-production with Alcon Entertainment)
 The Little Polar Bear (2001)
 Laura's Star (2004)
 The Little Polar Bear 2: The Mysterious Island (2005)
 Laura's Star and the Mysterious Dragon Nian (2009)

Notable direct-to-video films

Notable television shows 
 Tiny Toon Adventures (1990–1992, with Amblin Entertainment)
 Tazmania (1991-1994)
 Animaniacs (1993-1998, with Amblin Entertainment)
 The Adventures of Batman & Robin (1994–1995, with DC Comics)
 Free Willy (1994, with Nelvana and Regency)
 Freakazoid! (1995–1997, with Amblin Entertainment)
 Pinky and the Brain (1995–1998, with Amblin Entertainment)
 The Sylvester & Tweety Mysteries (1995–2002)
 Road Rovers (1996–1997)
 Superman: The Animated Series (1996–1997, with DC Comics)
 Waynehead (1996–1997, with Nelvana)
 The Legend of Calamity Jane (1997-1998)
 The New Batman/Superman Adventures (1997–2000, with DC Comics)
 The New Batman Adventures (1997–1999, with DC Comics)
 Histeria! (1998–2000)
 Pinky, Elmyra & the Brain (1998–1999, with Amblin Entertainment)
 Batman Beyond (1999–2001)
 Detention (1999–2000)
 Static Shock (2000–2004, with DC Comics)
 Justice League (2001–2004, with DC Comics)
 The Zeta Project (2001–2002, with DC Comics)
 Baby Looney Tunes (2002–2005)
 ¡Mucha Lucha! (2002–2005)
 Ozzy & Drix (2002–2004)
 What's New, Scooby-Doo? (2002–2006)
 Duck Dodgers (2003–2005)
 Teen Titans (2003–2006, with DC Comics)
 Xiaolin Showdown (2003–2006)
 The Batman (2004–2008, with DC Comics)
 Justice League Unlimited (2004–2006, with DC Comics)
 Coconut Fred's Fruit Salad Island (2005–2006)
 Johnny Test (2005–2014; first season only)
 Firehouse Tales (2005–2006)
 Krypto the Superdog (2005–2006, with DC Comics)
 Loonatics Unleashed (2005–2007)
 Legion of Super Heroes (2006–2008, with DC Comics)
 Shaggy & Scooby-Doo Get a Clue! (2006–2008)
 Tom and Jerry Tales (2006–2008, with Turner Entertainment Co.)

References 

Warner Bros.
Entertainment companies established in 1992
Entertainment companies disestablished in 2009
Children's mass media
Defunct film and television production companies of the United States